Huqa Pani is the first studio album by Pakistani pop singer Ali Zafar. Zafar started his career as a music composer and gained popularity by his successful single "Channo" from his debut album and earned him several awards for Best Music Album and Artist.

Track listing

Personnel
Programmed by Shuja Haider (1)
Produced by Shaany (2, 3, 4, 9)
Guitars by Danish (6)
Violins by Nijat (6)

Awards
Best Album – 3rd Lux Style Awards

Featured in other media
Ali Zafar, earlier from the release of album, collaborated with Shabnam Majid and sung "Jugnuon Se Bhar De Aanchal" for 2003 film Shararat. He then joined Coke Studio Pakistan, and sung "Rangeen", "Channo" and "Chal Dil Meray" in season 1, 2008. His "Channo" was also featured in an episode of animated TV series Burka Avenger in 2013, and in 2016 film Lahore Se Aagey.

Music videos
"Chal Dil Meray"
"Channo"
"Rangeen"
"Ek Pal"
"Jugnuon Se Bhar De Aanchal" (filmi duet)
"Rangeen" (Coke Studio)
"Channo" (Coke Studio)
"Chal Dil Meray" (Coke Studio)

See also
Ali Zafar discography

References

External links
Huqa Pani on SoundCloud
Buy Huqa Pani on Taazi

2003 albums
Ali Zafar albums